

Ştefan Botnarciuc (1875 in Bălți, Russian Empire – in 1900s) was a Bessarabian politician and a Ukrainian national farmer from Bălţi.

Biography 

He served as Member of the Moldovan Parliament (1917–1918). On 27 March 1918 Ştefan Botnarciuc voted for the Union of Bessarabia with Romania.

Gallery

Notes

Bibliography 
Gheorghe E. Cojocaru, Sfatul Țării: itinerar, Civitas, Chişinău, 1998, 
Mihai Taşcă, Sfatul Țării şi actualele autorităţi locale, "Timpul de dimineaţă", no. 114 (849), June 27, 2008 (page 16)

External links 
 Arhiva pentru Sfatul Tarii
 Deputaţii Sfatului Ţării şi Lavrenti Beria

Moldovan MPs 1917–1918
Year of death missing
1875 births